North Hudson is a village in St. Croix County, Wisconsin, United States. The population was 3,768 at the 2010 census.

Geography

Wisconsin Highway 35 serves as a main route in the community.

North Hudson is located at  (44.995367, -92.754966). Less specifically, it is immediately north of the city of Hudson.

Demographics

As of 2000 the median income for a household in the village was $60,848, and the median income for a family was $70,938. Males had a median income of $46,970 versus $30,313 for females. The per capita income for the village was $26,540. About 1.3% of families and 1.8% of the population were below the poverty line, including 1.9% of those under age 18 and 5.7% of those age 65 or over.

2010 census
As of the census of 2010, there were 3,768 people, 1,471 households, and 1,048 families residing in the village. The racial makeup of the village was 96.2% White, 0.9% African American, 0.6% Native American, 0.3% Asian, 0.1% Pacific Islander, 0.9% from other races, and 1.0% from two or more races. Hispanic or Latino of any race were 1.9% of the population.

There were 1,471 households, of which 35.7% had children under the age of 18 living with them, 57.0% were married couples living together, 8.8% had a female householder with no husband present, 5.5% had a male householder with no wife present, and 28.8% were non-families. 20.9% of all households were made up of individuals, and 4.9% had someone living alone who was 65 years of age or older. The average household size was 2.56 and the average family size was 2.98.

The median age in the village was 38.9 years. 26% of residents were under the age of 18; 6% were between the ages of 18 and 24; 28.1% were from 25 to 44; 29.6% were from 45 to 64; and 10.2% were 65 years of age or older. The gender makeup of the village was 49.3% male and 50.7% female.

Government
North Hudson has its own Police Department, North Hudson Police Department. Fire service is provided through the City of Hudson by Hudson Fire Department. Lakeview Ambulance provides  EMS.

The village president, Stanley Wekkin, was among 6 elected officials in Wisconsin found to be former members of the far-right anti-government group Oath Keepers.

Events 
North Hudson hosts the North Hudson Pepper Festival during the third full weekend of August each year. It began as a way to raise money for North Hudson Elementary School, and still to this day gives back money raised from it to community organizations. The festival has an Italian theme because when it began in 1954, there was a high population of Italians living in North Hudson. The festival includes events such as a parade, spaghetti or pepper eating contests, and a coronation where a king, a queen, and three princesses are chosen to serve as the North Hudson Pepper Festival Royalty for a year.

References

External links
 Village of North Hudson, WI -- Official website
 North Hudson Pepper Festival -- Official website

Villages in St. Croix County, Wisconsin
Villages in Wisconsin